Nathanael Barnes (born 11 October 1987) is an Australian rugby league footballer.

Barnes is the Tweed Heads Seagulls leading try scorer of all time. He scored a total of 73 tries in 92 games for the club in the Queensland Cup.

In 2012 he was named in the Queensland Residents side.

In 2012, he played for the Wynnum Manly Seagulls and trialled for the Brisbane Broncos, before joining the North Sydney Bears in the New South Wales Cup. He then returned to Tweed Heads Seagulls.

References

External links
Player Profile

1982 births
Living people
Australian rugby league players

Rugby league wingers
Tweed Heads Seagulls players
Wynnum Manly Seagulls players